Jessica Arellano (born December 20, 1982) known professionally as Jessy J, is an American saxophonist.

Biography 
Jessy J was born Jessica Arellano on December 20, 1982, in Portland, Oregon and raised in Hemet, California.  Of Mexican-American descent, her father is from Mexico and her mother is a native Texan. She began playing piano at the age of four. At the age of 15, at the Béla Bartók Festival, she won the Piano State Championship. She also played saxophone in state honored bands, such as the Grammy Band, and played internationally in festivals like the Montreux Jazz Festival in Switzerland. Earning a scholarship to University of Southern California, she obtained a degree in jazz studies and was named the "Most Outstanding Jazz Student".

While attending USC Jessy auditioned and was selected to join Disney as a member of the All American College Band two consecutive years in a row. As a band member she attended workshops learning critical skills, such as leadership, teamwork, and communication which gave her the confidence needed for creative song writing and organizing a band as a leader. In 2010 Jessy was inducted into Disney's Magic Music Days Hall of Fame.

After graduating from USC, she worked in the studio with Michael Bublé. She toured with The Temptations, Jessica Simpson, Michael Bolton, and Seal. Other Artists she has performed or recorded with include Taylor Swift, Chance the Rapper, Robin Thicke, Anita Baker, Andra Day  Maxwell, Joe Sample, Harvey Mason, and Ray Parker, Jr.

Jessy J performed on their twice Grammy nominated album Elevation as a member of the Henry Mancini Jazz Orchestra.  Jessy has performed on the hit television competition shows "American Idol" "The Voice" and "Dancing With the Stars." The year Steven Tyler was a judge on "Idol," he was so impressed with her performances that he invited her to play on Aerosmith's 2012 album Music From Another Dimension.

Prior to being a studio musician and touring as a jazz artist, Jessy J performed in the casts of Mason Entertainment Group's Off-Broadway shows Shockwave, Cyberjam, and M.I.X.  She performed not only as a saxophonist and singer but also as an actress and dancer. Touring with Mason Entertainment led her across the US, the United Kingdom, and Japan.

Jessy J's recording career began after producer/guitarist Paul Brown listened to her demo and gave her a spot on his tour.  She soon began making solo appearances.  Her first major solo performance was at the Catalina JazzTrax Festival in 2006. Soon afterward, she and Paul Brown were in the studio recording her first album, Tequila Moon.

Since beginning her career, she has toured with other jazz artists, such as Jeff Lorber, Jeff Golub, Euge Groove, Paul Brown, and Gerald Albright. In 2008/2009, she toured as a part of the Guitars & Saxes tour. In 2010 she Toured with Norman Brown and Brenda Russell in the Summer Storm Jazz tour.

Jessy was carefully selected along with a handful of talented young jazz artists by Selmer Saxophones to be part of a team of Master educators at schools to help advance music programs. Giving back to the community is something she had been doing while an undergraduate going to inner city schools. Leadership and teamwork was second nature.

Jessy J has built up a Latin following, lending her hand in Hispanic music programs and performing with the Hispanic Musician Association Orchestra. In 2006 Jessy J was hand selected by Paquito D'Rivera to perform at Carnegie Hall as part of the Latin Jazz Project featuring the "Rising Stars of Tomorrow". She has also worked in Mexico with artists Gloria Trevi (known as the Madonna of Mexico), Armando Manzanero (whom she calls "the Mancini of Mexico"), Grammy Nominated singer Cristian Castro, Rock of Ages star Diego Boneta, and Sheila E.

Her song "Tequila Moon" hit the #1 spot on the Billboard chart for Jazz. Her song "Tropical Rain", from her 2009 release, reached the top of the Groove Jazz Music chart and also took the #1 spot on the Smooth Jazz Top 20 Countdown, as well as the R&R and Billboard Jazz charts.

In 2008, Jessy J was named Radio & Records "Debut Artist of the Year".  She also received the "Contemporary Jazz Song of the Year" award from R&R and Billboard for her song "Tequila Moon". Also that year, she was featured on the cover of the May issue of Jazziz Magazine. In 2009, she was on the October cover of Saxophone Journal and Latina Style Magazine.

In 2011, Jessy's album Hot Sauce debuted at number one on the Billboard Jazz Albums chart and was featured in People Espanol and Latina magazine.  The album includes performances by Jazz Legends Joe Sample, Harvey Mason, and Ray Parker Jr.

Television performances 
2012 American Idol Finale w/ Neil Diamond
2012 American Idol performances with Phillip Phillips and Jessica Sanchez 
2012 The Voice "Just the Way You Are",  "Dancing in the Street" w/ Cee Lo Green
2011 CNN Espanol
2011 Univision, Acceso Total, Miami
2011 Telemundo, Llevantate
2011 Telemundo, Azul
2010 Fox Morning News
2009 Good Morning UK w/Seal
2009 Royal Albert Hall PBS Special w/ Michael Bolton
2008 Este Noche Tu Night, America TeVe
2008 Telemundo, Nitido
2006 The View w/Jessica Simpson
2006 Good Morning America w/Jessica Simpson
2006 NBC's Rockefeller Christmas Tree Ceremony w/Jessica Simpson
2004 BBC, Blue Peter

Discography
 Tequila Moon (Peak, 2008)
 True Love (Peak, 2009)
 Hot Sauce (Heads Up, 2011)
 Second Chances (Shanachie, 2013)
 My One and Only One (Shanachie, 2015)
 California Christmas (Changi Records, 2016)
 Live At Yoshi's: 10 Year Anniversary Special (Changi Records, 2018)
 Blue (Changi Records, 2022)
 California Christmas, Vol. 2 (Changi Records, 2022)

References

External links
 

American jazz saxophonists
American musicians of Mexican descent
Musicians from Portland, Oregon
Living people
1982 births
Smooth jazz saxophonists
American women jazz musicians
People from Hemet, California
USC Thornton School of Music alumni
21st-century American saxophonists
Women jazz saxophonists
21st-century American women musicians
Hispanic and Latino American musicians
Jazz musicians from California